The Satguru Ram Singh Marg  Metro Station is located on the Green Line of the Delhi Metro.
This section was opened on 27 August 2011 along with Kirti Nagar. Nearest Indian Railway Network Station is Patel Nagar Railway Station located adjacent to the metro station.

Station layout

References

Delhi Metro stations
Railway stations in West Delhi district